Dominik Olejniczak (born 1 July 1996) is a Polish professional basketball player for BCM Gravelines-Dunkerque of the LNB Pro A. He played college basketball for the Drake Bulldogs, the Ole Miss Rebels and the Florida State Seminoles.

College career
Olejniczak played for Drake as a freshman. In his sophomore and junior seasons, he played for Ole Miss. As a senior, he played for Florida State.

Professional career
On 1 July 2020, Olejniczak signed with Trefl Sopot of the Polish Basketball League.

On July 6, 2021, he has signed with BCM Gravelines-Dunkerque of the LNB Pro A.

National team career
Olejniczak played for Poland at the under-18 and under-20 levels before making his senior international debut for the team in 2016. He represented Poland at the 2014 Summer Youth Olympics and the EuroBasket 2017. Olejniczak helped Poland finish in eighth place at the 2019 FIBA Basketball World Cup.

Career statistics

College

|-
| style="text-align:left;"| 2015–16
| style="text-align:left;"| Drake
| 30 || 8 || 16.4 || .722 || – || .682 || 4.1 || .3 || .2 || .7 || 6.5
|-
| style="text-align:left;"| 2016–17
| style="text-align:left;"| Ole Miss
| style="text-align:center;" colspan="11"|  Redshirt
|-
| style="text-align:left;"| 2017–18
| style="text-align:left;"| Ole Miss
| 32 || 11 || 14.1 || .531 || – || .643 || 2.6 || .4 || .4 || .6 || 4.3
|-
| style="text-align:left;"| 2018–19
| style="text-align:left;"| Ole Miss
| 33 || 22 || 18.3 || .575 || – || .763 || 3.0 || .7 || .5 || .9 || 5.3
|-
| style="text-align:left;"| 2019–20
| style="text-align:left;"| Florida State
| 29 || 9 || 10.7 || .611 || – || .684 || 2.3 || .1 || .3 || .6 || 4.2
|- class="sortbottom"
| style="text-align:center;" colspan="2"| Career
| 124 || 50 || 15.0 || .609 || – || .698 || 3.0 || .4 || .4 || .7 || 5.1

References

External links
 

1996 births
Living people
2019 FIBA Basketball World Cup players
Basketball players at the 2014 Summer Youth Olympics
BCM Gravelines players
Centers (basketball)
Drake Bulldogs men's basketball players
Florida State Seminoles men's basketball players
Ole Miss Rebels men's basketball players
Polish expatriate basketball people in the United States
Polish men's basketball players
Sportspeople from Toruń